NGC 524 is a lenticular galaxy in the constellation Pisces. It is at a distance of about 90 million light-years away from Earth. In the central bulge of the galaxy is visible gas forming a spiral structure. It is the largest galaxy in the small NGC 524 group of galaxies, which is associated with NGC 488 and its group. It was discovered by William Herschel in 1786.

Two supernovae have been observed in the galaxy, SN 2000cx, a type Ia-p peaking at 14.5 magnitude, and SN 2008Q, type Ia.

Gallery

References

External links 
 
 
 SEDS

Lenticular galaxies
Pisces (constellation)
0524
00968
05222
Discoveries by William Herschel